Club Deportivo Cuautla is a Mexican football club based in Cuautla, Mexico. Their home stadium is Estadio Isidro Gil Tapia. The club plays in the Mexican Liga Premier in the Serie B.

History 
The club's history dates back to 1952 when the club was founded in Cuautla, Mexico and join the Segunda División Profesional. In 1953-54 the club finished runner-up. Due to the increased number of clubs in Primera División de México, the federation organized a promotional playoff series with: Cuautla; two teams from the 2nd Division (Zamora and Querétaro); and the last place two teams in Primera División de México (Atlante F.C. and Marte). The outcome: Atlante remained in 1st Division; Cuautla was promoted to the 1st Division; Querétaro remained in the 2nd Division; and Marte was demoted to 2nd Division.

The club played 4 years in the First division until its relegation in the 1958-59 season.

The club has come close to returning to the 1st Division on two occasions (first, 1971–72; second, 1978–79) when they lost to Atlas in promotional matches.

In modern times 

The club has played intermittently in the Segunda División Profesional since its last first-division appearance in 1959.

Players

Current squad

Season to season

Club Honors
Segunda División Profesional: 0
Runner-up (1): 1954

Promotional Play-off: 1
1955

References

External links
 All Mexican Clubs 

Association football clubs established in 1952
Football clubs in Morelos
Liga Premier de México